Mazgar (also Romanized as Māzgar; also known as Malger, Mesgar, and Misgar) is a village in Misheh Pareh Rural District, in the Central District of Kaleybar County, East Azerbaijan Province, Iran. At the 2006 census, its population was 148, in 22 families.

Mazgar has a significant potential for ecotourism due to its proximity to the pastures of Agdash. In past the location was a transient for migrating nomads of Mohammad Khanlu tribe.

References 

Populated places in Kaleybar County
Kurdish settlements in East Azerbaijan Province